Metalasia is a genus of African flowering plants in the tribe Gnaphalieae within the family Asteraceae.

 Species

References

Gnaphalieae
Asteraceae genera
Flora of Africa